Carrieri is an Italian surname. Notable people with the surname include:

Chris Carrieri (born 1980), American soccer player
Gaetano Carrieri (born 1988), Italian footballer
Matthew Carrieri ( 1420–1470), Dominican friar
Vincenza Carrieri-Russo

Italian-language surnames